Castle Rock is a tourist attraction in the Porongurup Range in the Great Southern region of Western Australia and is renowned for its fauna and flora.

The walk also takes in the unusual 'Balancing Rock', a  granite boulder which reportedly weighs around  yet rests on a base just .

A winery located on the eastern slopes of the range is named after this landmark.

References

External links 
 Images of Castle Rock - Porongurup Range

Granite domes
Great Southern (Western Australia)
Rock formations of Western Australia